One Columbia Place, originally named the Columbia Centre, is an office building in San Diego, California. It is the 18th tallest building in San Diego and a prominent fixture in the city's skyline. Atop the skyscraper is a flagpole flying the largest United States flag in the San Diego skyline.

It occupies the full block between West A Street, West B Street, Columbia Street and State Street. It has 27 stories above ground and three below ground.

The steel-and-glass building utilizes the modern architectural style and has a six-story atrium. Built in 1982 by developer Doug Manchester, it was renovated in 1993 and 1997. In 2004 it was designated an Energy Star building.

References

External links 
 https://www.1columbiaplace.com

Office buildings completed in 1982
Skyscraper office buildings in San Diego
1982 establishments in California